John Cronan Kieffer (born 1945) is an American mathematician best known for his work in information theory, ergodic theory, and stationary process theory.

Education
Kieffer received his elementary and high school education in St Louis, Missouri, a bachelor's degree in applied mathematics in 1967 from University of Missouri Rolla, and a master's degree in mathematics in 1968 from University of Illinois Urbana-Champaign.
In 1970, under Robert B. Ash, he received the Ph.D. degree in mathematics
from  University of Illinois Urbana-Champaign with thesis A Generalization of the Shannon-McMillan Theorem and Its Application to Information Theory.

Work history
In 1970 Kieffer became an assistant professor at Missouri University of Science and Technology, where he eventually became a full professor.
In 1986 he became a full professor at University of Minnesota Twin Cities. Kieffer held visiting appointments at 
Stanford University, University of Illinois Urbana-Champaign, ETH Zürich, and  University of Arizona. 
He has been the supervisor for 6 Ph.D. theses.

Professional activities
During the 1980's, Kieffer was Associate Editor of the IEEE Transactions on Information Theory. 
In 2004, Kieffer was co-editor of a special issue of the IEEE Transactions on Information Theory entitled "Problems on Sequences: Information Theory and Computer Science Interface".
 He is a Life Fellow of the Institute of Electrical and Electronics Engineers "for contributions to information theory, particularly coding theory and quantization".

Key works
1. Key works on grammar-based coding:

2. Key works on channel coding:

3. Key works on quantization:
 

4. Key works on ergodic theory:

5. Key works on stationary process theory:

Inventions
Multilevel Pattern Matching Grammar-Based Code
SEQUENTIAL Grammar-Based Code
Longest-Match Grammar-Based Code

Impact
Kieffer has over 70 journal publications in the mathematical sciences.
His research work has attracted over 3000 Google Scholar citations, over 500 MathSciNet citations
and over 1000 IEEE Xplore citations. Some of these works have been cited as prior art
on various United States patents.
In 1998, the IEEE Transactions on Information Theory published a special issue consisting of articles that survey research in information theory during 1948-1998. Two
of these articles include discussions of Kieffer's work, namely, the article Lossy Source Coding by Toby Berger and Jerry Gibson, and the article Quantization by
Robert M. Gray and David Neuhoff. In addition, the textbook Transmitting and Gaining Data by Rudolf Ahlswede presents several aspects of Kieffer's work.

References

External links 
Robert B. Ash obituary

American information theorists
University of Illinois Urbana-Champaign alumni
Fellow Members of the IEEE
University of Minnesota faculty
Living people
Missouri University of Science and Technology alumni
Missouri University of Science and Technology faculty
1945 births